Acmispon junceus, synonyms Lotus junceus and Syrmatium junceum, is a species of legume native to California. It is known by the common names rush broom and rush deervetch. It is endemic to California, where it is known from the northern and central coast and the coastal mountain ranges. It can be found from beaches inland to serpentine slopes and chaparral. It is a hairy, prostrate or spreading perennial herb lined with leaves each made up of small oval leaflets. The inflorescence bears up 8 yellow pealike flowers each up to about a centimeter long. The fruit is a small beaked legume pod.

References

Jepson Manual Treatment
USDA Plants Profile

External links
Photo gallery

junceus
Endemic flora of California